Black Danger is a masked Mexican professional wrestler (luchador enmascarado in Spanish). He is primarily known for working for promotions such as The Crash Lucha Libre, Lucha Libre AAA Worldwide and Major League Wrestling where he portrays a rudo ("Bad guy") wrestling character. He previously worked under the ring names Mega Danger and Espectro . Black Danger is a former holder of The Crash Junior Championship and is also a member of La Rebelión Amarilla. His real name is not a matter of public record, as is often the case with masked wrestlers in Mexico, where their private lives are kept a secret from the wrestling fans.

Personal life
Black Danger is the nephew of Super Xolo and the cousin of Mirage, both wrestlers.

Championships and accomplishments
The Crash Lucha Libre
The Crash Junior Championship (1 time)
Promociones EMW
EMW World Middleweight Championship (1 time, current)

Luchas de Apuestas record

References

External links 
 

Date of birth missing (living people)
Living people
Masked wrestlers
Mexican male professional wrestlers
People from Tijuana
Professional wrestlers from Baja California
Year of birth missing (living people)